Metallothionein-3 (also known as Growth Inhibitory Factor) is a protein that in humans is encoded by the MT3 gene.
It is a 68-amino acid peptide (20 of which are cysteine) that is abnormally under-expressed in the brains of patients with Alzheimer's disease.
Metallothionein-3 is a member of the metallothionein family of proteins.

References

Further reading